Nan Blair (28 Sep 1891 – August 15, 1944), born Clyte Cosper, was an American screenwriter and literary agent active primarily during Hollywood's silent era.

Personal life 
Blair was born in Dallas, Oregon, to Otis Cosper and Nettie Niece. Her first husband Joseph Elizalde died in Santa Barbara in 1917, around the time she began writing screenplays in Hollywood. She later married Sheldon Ballinger; their marriage that ended in divorce. Benjamin Dailey was her third husband; they were married until her death in Los Angeles in 1944.

Career 
By 1918, Blair headed up the script-reading department at Triangle Pictures, where she worked on shorts like A Dream of Egypt and A Prince for a Day. She later headed Palmer Photoplays' manuscript sales department and was affiliated with Zeppo Marx Inc. Her last known credit was on This Is the Life in 1935.

Selected filmography 
 A Dream of Egypt (1917) (short)
 A Prince for a Day (1917) (short)
 Little Mariana's Triumph (1917) (short)
 Trail of No Return (1918) (short)
 Whom the Gods Would Destroy (1919)
 The Hawk's Trail (1919)
 The Fatal Wallop (1920)
 Beach of Dreams (1921)
The Love Trap (1923)
 This Is the Life (1935)

References 

1891 births
1944 deaths
American women screenwriters
Screenwriters from Oregon
20th-century American women writers
20th-century American screenwriters